Jean Philippe Barros is an American politician. He served as a Democratic member for the 59th district of the Rhode Island House of Representatives.

In 2015, Barros won the election for the 59th district of the Rhode Island House of Representatives. He succeeded J. Patrick O'Neill. Barros assumed his office on January 6, 2015. He decided to run for re-election for the 59th district.

References 

Living people
Place of birth missing (living people)
Year of birth missing (living people)
Democratic Party members of the Rhode Island House of Representatives
21st-century American politicians